Eerik-Juhan Truuväli (7 March 1938 – 25 June 2019) was an Estonian lawyer and professor of legal theory at the University of Tartu.

From 1989 to 1993 he was the chairman of the Estonian National Electoral Committee.

From 1993 to 2000 he was the Chancellor of Justice of Estonia.

Honors
 2000 Order of the National Coat of Arms
 2001 Ida-Virumaa Order
 2006 Order of the White Star

References

1938 births
2019 deaths
Ombudsmen in Estonia
20th-century Estonian lawyers
Recipients of the Order of the White Star, 2nd Class
Recipients of the Order of the National Coat of Arms, 3rd Class
20th-century Estonian politicians
21st-century Estonian politicians
Academic staff of the University of Tartu